The International Scientific Committee on Cultural Landscapes (ISCCL) is a committee of scientific experts on cultural landscapes that works, as a part of the International Council on Monuments and Sites (ICOMOS), to develop international guidance on cultural landscape documentation and management, and to prepare expert recommendations for prospective World Heritage nominations.  The committee functions as a joint effort with members from both ICOMOS and the International Federation of Landscape Architects (IFLA).

About 

UNESCO has defined cultural landscapes as "the combined works of nature and man [sic]."  The ISCCL, composed of scientific experts from around the world, functions to advise "ICOMOS on matters relating to the identification, documentation, assessment, conservation and presentation of cultural landscapes, including those that are nominated or designated as World Heritage sites."  The committee develops statements and principles as guidance for both World Heritage and as technology transfer for cultural landscape management worldwide. The committee functions and work are governed by the Eger-Xi’an Principles for The International [Scientific] Committees of ICOMOS, as adopted in July 2008.

The focus of UNESCO World Heritage designation has turned more recently to the importance of cultural landscapes as the bridge between the designation and protection of both natural heritage and cultural heritage sites. Although Natural Heritage sites are evaluated by IUCN (International Union for Conservation of Nature), more recently there has been a co-operative effort between ICOMOS and IUCN to designate and manage sites in tandem.

History 
The parent organization of the ISCCL, the International Council on Monuments and Sites (ICOMOS) was established in 1965.  However, it was not until 1971 that the ISCCL was first established with an initial focus on gardens. The broadening of focus to cultural landscapes in 1999 reflected a changing understanding of the role of landscapes in culture and heritage, and as the link between humans and nature.
The Committee is well known for its work to produce the ICOMOS Florence Charter on Historic Gardens (1982), which at the time was innovative for the recognition of dynamic plant assemblages in historic gardens as a form of 'monument'.

Annual meetings and symposia 
 1971 Fontainebleau, France: Restoration of historic gardens
 1972 Paris, France
 1973 Grenada, Spain: Islamic Gardens
 1974 Brussels, Belgium
 1975 Zeist, Netherlands: Ornamental Plants in 16th and 17th century gardens
 1976 Brussels, Belgium
 1977 Prague/Kromeriz, Czechoslovakia (now Czech Republic)
 1978 Paris, France
 1979 Bruges/Brussels, Belgium
 1980 Barcelona, Spain
 1981 Florence, Italy
 1982 Brussels, Belgium
 1983 München, Germany
 1984 Brussels, Belgium
 1985 Versailles, France
 1986 Copenhagen, Denmark
 1987 Oxford, England
 1988 La Napoule/Menton, France
 1989 Potsdam, Germany
 1990 Lausanne, Switzerland; Leiden, Netherlands
 1991 Pisa, Italy
 1992 Aranjuez, Spain
 1993 Montréal, Canada
 1994 Fulda, Germany
 1995 Pultusk, Poland
 1996 Berlin/Dessau/Wortliz, Germany; Sofia, Bulgaria
 1997 Prague/Lednice-Valtice/Cesky Krumlov, Czech Republic: Landscape heritge
 1998 Aranjuez
 1999 Berlin, Germany; Guadalajara, Mexico
 2000 Naples, Italy
 2001 Buenos Aires, Argentina: Historic Gardens – multidisciplinary approach
 2002 Madrid, Spain
 2002 Ferrara, Italy UNESCO World Heritage Center 
 2003 Bad-Muskau, Germany
 2004 Brussels, Belgium
 2005 Xi’an, China
 2006 Coimbra, Portugal
 2007 San José, Costa Rica
 2008 Québec, Canada
 2009 Tokyo, Japan
 2010 Istanbul, Turkey
 2011 Fontainebleau/Paris, France: 1971-201130 year retrospective
 2012 Hangzhou, China
 2013 Canberra, Australia
 2014 Florence, Italy
 2015 Jeju, South Korea
 2016 Bath, England
 2017 New Delhi, India – Committee meeting and lead on the Culture Nature Journey 
 2018 Mendoza, Argentina – Symposium on urban, periurban and rural cultural landscapes: Benefits, Problems, Opportunities, December 10–13.
 2019 Dublin, Ireland
 2019 Marrakesh, Morocco – Rural Heritage: Landscapes and Beyond, symposium organizers, International Scientific Committee Symposium at the ICOMOS General Assembly, October 17.

Initiatives 

World Rural Landscapes

To develop an international working group to "foster the worldwide cooperation in the understanding, management and protection of rural landscapes".

ICOMOS passed a doctrinal Principles text "Concerning Rural Landscape as Heritage" at the 19th ICOMOS General Assembly in Delhi India on the 15th of December 2017.

Nature Culture Journey

September 2016: The development of the "Mālama Honua, a statement of Commitments from the Nature-Culture Journey at the IUCN World Conservation Congress, Hawaii
December 2017: Culture Nature Journey at the ICOMOS General Assembly, New Delhi

References

External links 
 Nature Culture Journey
 World Rural Landscapes Initiative

Organizations established in 1971
Heritage organizations
International cultural organizations